Imperial Arena or Imperial Ballroom is a multipurpose venue used as a ballroom, convention space, and a basketball arena located at Atlantis Paradise Island. It's most known for being the host of the Battle 4 Atlantis, a men's and women's early-season college basketball tournament that takes place in late November, around Thanksgiving.

Basketball
Although the ballroom opened in November 2007, it did undergo transformation until November 2011 when the inaugural Battle 4 Atlantis was played. The Ballroom is 50,000 square feet, has dimensions of 289' x 165' and has a 26' ceiling, making it one of the lowest ceilings for a college basketball venue.

Reception
NC State head coach, Kevin Keatts compared the arena and its 3,500-seat capacity to playing in a smaller Division I venue where fans are packed into a more intimate environment. Keatts stated, "It's packed and it's fun and can get going in there, it's an exciting place to play."

Baylor head coach and NCAA champion, Scott Drew said, "When they walked in, they saw it (Imperial Arena), they saw the lighting, they saw what quality of floor it was, they were really excited to play here. You know what, sometimes when you do things different, it's really neat and something they'll always remember."

References

Basketball venues
Hotels in the Bahamas
Sports venues in the Bahamas
Basketball in the Bahamas
2007 establishments in the Bahamas
Sports venues completed in 2007